Vly Mountain is a mountain located in the town of Halcott, New York, United States in Greene County. 
The mountain is part of the Catskill Mountains.
Vly Mountain is flanked to the northwest by Bearpen Mountain, to the east by Vinegar Hill, to the northeast by Kipp Hill, and to the southeast by Beech Ridge.

The north side of Vly Mountain drains into Little West Kill, thence into Schoharie Creek, the Mohawk River, the Hudson River, and into New York Bay.
The east side of Vly Mtn. drains through Roarback Brook into the West Kill, thence into Schoharie Creek.
The south and west sides of Vly Mountain drain into Vly Creek, thence into Bush Kill, Dry Brook, the East Branch of the Delaware River, and into Delaware Bay.

Notes

See also 
 List of mountains in New York

External links 
  Peakbagger.com: Vly Mountain
 Vly Mountain Hiking Information Catskill 3500 Club
 

Mountains of Greene County, New York
Catskill High Peaks
Mountains of New York (state)